Holy Trinity Brompton with St Paul's, Onslow Square and St Augustine's, South Kensington, often referred to simply as HTB, is an Anglican church in London, England. The church consists of six sites: HTB Brompton Road, HTB Onslow Square (formerly St Paul's, Onslow Square), HTB Queen's Gate (formerly St Augustine's, South Kensington), HTB Courtfield Gardens (formerly St Jude's Church, Kensington – officially in the parish of St Mary of the Bolton's but part of HTB), as well as being the home of the St Paul's Theological Centre and the Alpha Course, HTB St. Francis Dalgarno Way and St Luke's Earls Court St Luke's Church Redcliffe Gardens. It is where the Alpha Course was first developed and is one of the most influential churches in the Church of England.

The church buildings accommodate Alpha, other courses, conferences and meetings during the week and ten services each Sunday. With total Sunday service attendance at around 4,500 people and the Alpha course attracting several hundred guests during the week, HTB oversees a diverse range of activities. HTB's vision statement is to "play our part in the evangelization of the nations, the revitalization of the church and the transformation of society."

HTB's aim is for an Alpha Course to be accessible to anyone who would like to attend the course. In this way, HTB seeks to spread the teachings of Christianity.

Nicky Gumbel, the developer of the Alpha course, took over as vicar of HTB from Sandy Millar in July 2005, followed by Archie Coates in September 2022. The associate vicar is Katherine Chow, who took over from Nicky Lee and Martyn Layzell in 2020.

History

Holy Trinity
Prior to the construction of Holy Trinity Brompton, the present site was a part of the large parish of Kensington which was served only by the nearby St Mary Abbots church. In the early 1820s the area was in the midst of a substantial population increase, so a decision was taken to purchase land and construct a new church.

The church was a Commissioners' church, receiving a grant from the Church Building Commission towards its cost.  The full cost of the church was £10,407, towards which the Commission paid £7,407.  The architect was Thomas Leverton Donaldson.  Holy Trinity is a Grade II listed building.

After three years of construction, the church was consecrated on 6 June 1829 by the Bishop of London.

The same building stands today, although having been considerably modified. In 1852 a portion of HTB's land was sold to the Roman Catholic Church in order for them to build the London Oratory. This created a long driveway from Brompton Road at the end of which HTB manages to gain relative tranquility.

The most recent major modification was during the 1980s when the crypt was rebuilt to provide meeting rooms and the space for the bookshop. Also during this time, the pews were removed and replaced with chairs to allow greater flexibility in seating arrangements, which became imperative as take-up of the Alpha Course grew.

The substantial growth of the Alpha Course since 1993 has seen this course become the main focus of HTB, with its recent history reflecting this.

List of vicars

St Paul's Onslow Square
St Paul's Church in Onslow Square was opened in 1860. In the late 1970s, the parish of Holy Trinity Brompton merged with the neighbouring parish of St Paul's Onslow Square. St Paul's was declared redundant. An attempt by the diocese to sell the building for private redevelopment was thwarted in the early 1980s when local residents joined with churchgoers to save the church. In the late 1980s, the Parochial Church Council requested that the redundancy be overturned which allowed curate Nicky Lee and his wife Sila to "plant" a congregation there as well as undertake some building structural maintenance work. At its peak in the 1990s, this congregation had grown to several hundred.

In 1997, the congregation at St Paul's divided into three, with some going with curate Stuart Lees to plant a church in Fulham; others returning to Holy Trinity with Nicky and Sila Lee; and others forming the St Paul's Anglican Fellowship and remaining based at St Paul's with John Peters. This last group left in 2002 to plant into St Mary's, Bryanston Square.

During 2007, after plans by HTB to rebuild the 1960s offices were withdrawn following difficulty in getting support from local residents, HTB decided to undertake some renovations and to resume services in the church. St Paul's launched 9:00 am and 6:00 pm services in September 2007 and followed with an 11AM service on 20 January 2008 and a 4 pm service on 28 September 2009. In December 2009 the upstairs balcony was recommissioned for worship, having previously been used for administrative offices (the office occupants having moved to HTB's nearby office building purchased in 2008).

St Augustine's Church 
Services at St Augustine's, Queen's Gate began to be administered from Holy Trinity Brompton following an invitation by the Bishop of Kensington in 2010, where Nicky Gumbel was made priest-in-charge. In March 2011, St Augustine's was formally merged into the parish of HTB.

Church plants

Since the 1980s, HTB has been involved in planting churches. This has resulted in a large number of churches that can be linked back to HTB either as a result of being directly planted by the church (so called daughter churches), or by being the plants of churches planted by HTB (so called granddaughter churches). This web of churches form the HTB network.

Alpha and HTB
The Alpha course was founded by clergy at HTB who, over a period of twenty years, kept adapting the programme in accordance with feedback until in the early 1990s, when the Alpha course started gaining worldwide attention. As Alpha grew it became the main focus for HTB as it sought to support Alpha's spread and growth.

Today, this involves the production of advertising material and course material such as videos, books and tapes for each Alpha session and leader training material. Alpha is now run as a separate enterprise with separate fundraising and accounting, but it remains closely tied to HTB, with most of Alpha's staff being accommodated in HTB's offices. The clergy of HTB also share Alpha duties such as overseeing Alpha conferences and training events in the UK and overseas.

Since the mid-1990s, the Alpha course programme has remained largely unchanged allowing the energy of the church to develop other initiatives which fit with the Alpha course such as creating courses on marriage preparation, parenting teenagers, bereavement and recovering from divorce, as well as publishing new books.

HTB itself runs Alpha courses three times a year, and with these attracting 300–400 guests during each course, they require all of the available space in the church buildings.

Pastoral care

In order to address the problem of how to give pastoral care to such a large congregation as well as provide a means for new people to become a part of the church, HTB uses the Pastorate model.

Pastorates consist of 20–50 people who, through meeting at least once a fortnight, can form strong friendships and support each other in care as well as developing individual gifts and ministries.

HTB has quite a transient congregation caused in part by its location in London, a city which itself has a transient population, in particular a large student population who only reside in London during their studies, and that HTB is able to attract; and also in part by the fact that the Alpha course brings in a number of people to HTB who are either visiting the home of Alpha or have completed the course and then quickly move on to other churches or ministries.

Services
HTB conducts ten services each Sunday across the four sites. The family services include items aimed at children. The formal services feature traditional Church of England liturgy and a professional choir. The informal services centre on a longer period of contemporary worship with a longer talk and close in a reflective prayer mood which extends beyond the end of the service.

The 4:30pm and 6:30pm services at HTB Onslow Square church extend this informal nature further as most of the congregation sit on carpet, whilst some couches, cushions and bean bags are also provided. These services are sometimes conducted in the round.

Some services reuse the same talk and song list from a service earlier in the day.

Other activities
Another activity of HTB is its yearly church camp, named "Focus". This takes place over the course of a week in Somerley Estate, where typically 7,000 people attend and involve themselves in the many seminars, workshops and recreational activities. The size also attracts some prominent speakers to speak on issues affecting the church and society.

Since 1985, HTB has been actively involved in a process called church planting whereby struggling churches in London are boosted by scores – sometimes hundreds – of people committing to move from HTB to the identified church for at least a year. This also involves at least one member of HTB's clergy similarly moving to the new church to help lead worship, form pastorates and run local Alpha courses. Over the years, nine churches have been planted in this way, including St Gabriel's, Cricklewood, with some of these churches going on to make church plants of their own.

HTB also has thriving children's, youth and student ministries. Other activities HTB undertakes are services twice a year involving the large HTB choir – at Easter and Christmas – and several free classical concerts that utilise the church's pipe organ, refurbished in 2004, as well as drawing on the talent of the nearby music colleges.

In September 2005 HTB started providing the talks given at the Sunday services as free downloads from its website and through their iTunes, YouTube and SoundCloud account. These downloads, which HTB has termed HTB Podcasts, have proved popular and, more recently, other talks specifically provided for the HTB Podcast community have also been offered, including answers to questions sent in by listeners. Each month the total download count from this catalogue of talks is over 40,000, with some talks making it into the top ten in the "Religion and Spirituality" section for iTunes.

In 2011 HTB formed the William Wilberforce Trust to bring together various social action projects that were linked with HTB. These projects include work in deprived neighbourhoods, addressing homelessness and providing practical support for people with addictions.

HTB is also home to:
 St Paul's Theological Centre
 The Alpha Course

See also

 List of Commissioners' churches in London
 The Reverend Nicky Gumbel, Vicar
 The Reverend Katherine Chow, Associate Vicar
 The Reverend Martyn Layzell, previous Associate Vicar

Previous Associate Vicar, the Reverend Nicky Lee continues as a senior member of staff, with continuing responsibility together with Mrs Sila Lee for the Marriage Course.

References

External links

 HTB website
 Mystery Worshipper reports at the Ship of Fools website: 2005, 2007, 2013, 2015
 HTB Sound Design – A Story of Excellent Sound 
 William Wilberforce Trust

 
Churches completed in 1829
19th-century Church of England church buildings
Religious organizations established in 1829
Evangelicalism in the Church of England
Brompton
Holy Trinity Brompton
London, Holy Trinity Brompton
Diocese of London
1829 establishments in England